Capital University, Jharkhand (CUJ) is a private university located at Koderma, Jharkhand, India. It was established in 2018 by the Ch. Charan Singh Educational Society under the Capital University Act, 2018, following the approval of the Bill by the Jharkhand cabinet in July 2018 and passing the bill in the Jharkhand Legislative Assembly later that month.

Academics 
CUJ offers undergraduate and postgraduate degree programs in various disciplines. It has the following academic departments:

 Faculty of Agriculture
 Faculty of Computer Science
 Faculty of Engineering
 Faculty of Business
 Faculty of Management 
 Faculty of Humanities 
 Faculty of Para Medical
 Faculty of Science
 Faculty of Social Studies

See also
Education in India
List of private universities in India
List of institutions of higher education in Jharkhand

References

External links
 

Koderma district
Universities in Jharkhand
Educational institutions established in 2018
2018 establishments in Jharkhand
Private universities in India
Kodarma